Thomas Resch (1460-1520) was an Austrian Renaissance humanist.  He went by the Latin name of Thomas Velocianus.  He was a member of a circle of humanists based in Vienna.  This circle included the scholars Georg Tannstetter, Johannes Stabius, Stiborius,  Stefan Rosinus (1470-1548), Johannes Cuspinianus, and the reformer Joachim Vadianus.  These humanists were associated with the court of Maximilian I, Holy Roman Emperor.

References

External links
 Renaissance-Humanism
 [ivv7srv15.uni-muenster.de/ mnkg/pfnuer/Eckbriefe/N032.html Eck an Gabriel von Eyb, B. von Eichstät]
Celtisodae (Latin source)

Austrian Renaissance humanists
Austrian philosophers
Year of birth missing
Year of death missing